Yuriy Serhiyovych Klymchuk (born 5 May 1997) is a Ukrainian professional footballer who plays as a left winger for the Ukrainian Premier League club Rukh Lviv.

Career
Klymchuk is a product of the different Kyivan youth team systems.

From March 2016 he plays for FC Stal Kamianske and made his debut for FC Stal in the game against FC Zirka Kropyvnytskyi on 23 April 2017 in the Ukrainian Premier League.

References

External links
 
 
 

1997 births
Living people
Ukrainian footballers
Association football forwards
FC Lokomotyv Kyiv players
FC Stal Kamianske players
FC Rukh Lviv players
Ukrainian Premier League players
Ukrainian First League players
Sportspeople from Zhytomyr Oblast